Cordia is a genus of flowering plants in the borage family, Boraginaceae. It contains about 300 species of shrubs and trees, that are found worldwide, mostly in warmer regions. Many of the species are commonly called manjack, while  may refer to several Central American species in Spanish. 

The generic name honours German botanist and pharmacist Valerius Cordus (1515–1544). Like most other Boraginaceae, the majority have trichomes (hairs) on the leaves.

Taxonomy
The taxonomy of Cordia is complex and controversial. Gottschling et al. (2005) say this is partly due to "extraordinarily high intraspecific variability" in some groups of species, making identification difficult, and partly due to new taxa having been "airily described on the basis of poorly preserved herbarium specimens".

Selected species

Cordia africana Lam. – White manjack
Cordia alliodora (Ruiz & Pav.) Oken – Spanish elm, Ecuador laurel, salmwood, bocote (Neotropics)
Cordia boissieri A.DC. – Anacahuita, Texas olive (southern Texas, Northern Mexico)
Cordia curassavica (Jacq.) Roem. & Schult. – Black sage, wild sage
Cordia dentata Poir. – White manjack
Cordia dichotoma G.Forst – Fragrant manjack, bird lime tree (Tropical Asia and Australasia)
Cordia leucophlyctis  – (endemic to the Galápagos Islands)
Cordia lutea  – Yellow cordia (western South America, including the Galápagos Islands)
Cordia monoica
Cordia myxa L. – Assyrian plum (South Asia)Cordia domestica is treated as a separate species by some sources, and as C. myxa var. domestica by others. Cordia obliqua  (the clammy cherry) has been placed in the "Cordia myxa complex", or treated as a synonym for Cordia dichotoma.
Cordia platythyrsa Baker – West African cordia
Cordia rupicola Urban – Puerto Rico manjack (Puerto Rico)
Cordia sebestena L. – Geiger tree, large-leaf Geigertree (southern Florida, Greater Antilles, Central America)
Cordia sinensis Lam. (=C. gharaf) – Grey-leafed saucerberry
Cordia subcordata Lam. – Kou, tou, marer (Africa, South Asia, Southeast Asia, northern Australia, Pacific Islands)
Cordia sulcata DC. – Mucilage manjack, laylay, white manjack, wild clammy cherry
Cordia trichotoma (Vell.) Arráb. ex Steud.

Formerly placed here
 Carmona retusa (Vahl) Masam. (as C. retusa Vahl)

Ecology
Cordia species are used as food plants by the caterpillars of some Lepidoptera species, such as Endoclita malabaricus, Bucculatrix caribbea, and Bucculatrix cordiaella. The wild olive tortoise beetle (Physonota alutacea) feeds on C. boissieri, C. dentata, C. inermis, and C. macrostachya.

Uses

Ornamental
Many members of this genus have fragrant, showy flowers and are popular in gardens, although they are not especially hardy.

As food
A number of the tropical species have edible fruits, known by a wide variety of names including clammy cherries, glue berries, sebesten, or snotty gobbles.  In India, the fruits of local species are used as a vegetable, raw, cooked, or pickled, and are known by many names, including lasora in Hindi. One such species is fragrant manjack (C. dichotoma), which is called gunda or tenti dela in Hindi and lasura in Nepali.  The fruit of the fragrant manjack is called phoà-pò·-chí (破布子), 樹子仔, or 樹子(Pe̍h-ōe-jī: chhiū-chí) in Taiwan where they are eaten pickled.

Glue
The white, gooey inner pulp of the fruits is traditionally used to make glue.

Wood 
The wood of several Cordia species is commercially harvested. Ecuador laurel (C. alliodora), ziricote (C. dodecandra), Spanish elm (C. gerascanthus), and C. goeldiana are used to make furniture and doors in Central and South America.

Ziricote and bocote are sometimes used as tonewoods for making the backs and sides of high-end acoustic guitars such as the Richard Thompson signature model from Lowden. Similarly, drums are made from C. abyssinica, C. millenii, and C. platythyrsa due to the resonance of the wood.

Smoking 
Cordia leaves can be dried and used to smoke marijuana with.

Gallery

References

 
Fruit vegetables
Taxa named by Carl Linnaeus
Boraginaceae genera